James Edmund McCabe (7 October 1922 – 24 January 2019) was an Australian politician.

Early life 
He was born in Nhill to farmer Roy Clifton McCabe and schoolteacher Margaret Maud Renkin, and was educated at local state schools. He became a stock and station agent, and also worked as a butcher at Dimboola before becoming a farmer at Gerung Gerung. During World War II he served with the Australian Imperial Force in the Middle East and Borneo, and on 26 February 1947 he married Florence Hope Eastick, with whom he had four children. A member of the Liberal Party, he was elected to the Victorian Legislative Assembly in 1964 as the member for Lowan. Defeated in 1967, he was returned in 1970 and held the seat until his defeat in 1979. He died in January 2019 at the age of 96.

References

1922 births
2019 deaths
Liberal Party of Australia members of the Parliament of Victoria
Members of the Victorian Legislative Assembly
Australian military personnel of World War II
Australian stock and station agents